Zopherus laevicollis is a species of ironclad beetle in the family Zopheridae.

References

Tenebrionoidea
Beetles described in 1841